Porcellio festai is a species of woodlouse in the genus Porcellio belonging to the family Porcellionidae that is endemic to Italy.

References

Crustaceans described in 1932
Endemic fauna of Italy
Porcellionidae
Woodlice of Europe